In molecular biology, glycoside hydrolase family 32 is a family of glycoside hydrolases.

Glycoside hydrolases  are a widespread group of enzymes that hydrolyse the glycosidic bond between two or more carbohydrates, or between a carbohydrate and a non-carbohydrate moiety. A classification system for glycoside hydrolases, based on sequence similarity, has led to the definition of >100 different families. This classification is available on the CAZy web site, and also discussed at CAZypedia, an online encyclopedia of carbohydrate active enzymes.

Family 32 glycosyl hydrolases comprise two distinct domains. The N-terminal domain, which forms a five bladed beta propeller, and the C-terminal domain, which forms a beta sandwich structure.

References 

EC 3.2.1
GH family
Protein families